Niceritrol is a niacin derivative used as a hypolipidemic agent. It is an ester of pentaerythritol and nicotinic acid, has general properties similar to those of nicotinic acid (Nicotinamide), to which it is slowly hydrolysed. Niceritrol has been used as a lipid regulating drug in hyperlipidaemias and as a vasodilator in the treatment of peripheral vascular disease.

References 

Nicotinate esters